Champlin may refer to:

People
Champlin (surname)

Places
Champlin, Minnesota, United States, a city
Champlin Creek, New York
Champlin, Ardennes, a French commune in the Ardennes department
Champlin, Nièvre, a French commune in the Nièvre department

Other uses
USS Champlin, two destroyers, both named in honor of Stephen Champlin
Champlin Foundations, one of the oldest philanthropic organization groups in Rhode Island
Champlin Architecture, an architecture firm headquartered in Cincinnati, Ohio
Champlin Fighter Museum, an aircraft museum that closed in 2003
Champlin Memorial Masonic Temple, Boone, Iowa, on the National Register of Historic Places